Sypniewo  is a village in the administrative district of Gmina Jastrowie, within Złotów County, Greater Poland Voivodeship, in west-central Poland. 

The village has a population of 1,300.

Notable residents
 Ernst Ottwalt (November 13, 1901 – August 24, 1943), author

References

Villages in Złotów County